Remy Royer (6 April 1911 – 26 May 1970) was a French racing cyclist. He rode in the 1936 Tour de France.

References

External links
 

1911 births
1970 deaths
French male cyclists
Place of birth missing